Julianne Michelle (born September 5, 1984) is an American film and television actress. She has appeared in more than 23 productions, beginning in 1990 when she was six years old.

Personal life 
Julianne Michelle began her acting career when she was discovered by a producer at the age of six. She was born in Teaneck, New Jersey and lives in New York City. She lived as a child in Manhattan, Beverly Hills, and Las Vegas, and was briefly homeschooled. She attended Marymount School in Manhattan, Columbia University, Marymount Manhattan College and Cornell University.  Julianne holds a Master's degree from Columbia University, where she studied clinical social work.

Julianne has been recognized for her work with several Best Actress awards and nominations and has graced the cover of and has been featured in several magazines including Teen People, 25A Magazine, Metropolitan Magazine, Social Life Magazine, and Resident Magazine.

Marriage 
On November 21, 2015 Julianne Michelle married Karl Reeves, the CEO of a New York City based elevator service company named Consolidated Elevator (C.E.I. New York). They were wed at St. Ignatius Loyola church by Rev. Daniel G. O'Hare, a Roman Catholic priest. Karl and Julianne had a daughter together shortly after.

Divorce 
After 14 months of marriage, Julianne a Karl started a lengthy divorce process that has so far spanned four years. Most currently, on December 3, 2019 the court ordered that custody of their daughter be temporarily changed over to the father with no visitation rights for Julianne unless supervised.

Career 

Julianne Michelle is two-time winner "Best Actress" award for the feature films "The House is Burning" also starring Melissa Leo and "Awakened" also starring Steven Bauer and Edward Furlong.  Young Artist Award for Best Leading Young Actress in a Feature Film winner for her roles in the films The House Is Burning (2006) and Awakened (2013). In 1991 she was nominated for her guest appearance on Who's The Boss?; and in 1993 for "Best Actress Under Age 6" for the movie Family Prayers;  In 1996, she voiced the character Dot Hugson from The Oz Kids. In 1998, she was nominated for "Best Actress in a TV Series" for the 1998 TV movie Bus No. 9.

In its 2001 WB TV special, Teen People Magazine named Michelle "One of 20 Teens Who Would Change the World".  She is host committee chair for the Children at Heart Celebrity Auction and Dinner to benefit the children of Chernobyl with Chairman Steven Spielberg. and she stars as Samantha Winston in Awakened with Steven Bauer, Edward Furlong, Sally Kirkland.

Michelle appeared once on the Di Palma Forum, a televised talk celebrity panel which her father, Joseph Di Palma, established at University of Nevada, Las Vegas.  The forum features celebrities discussing issues of national interest, and is televised four times a year as The Di Palma Forum at UNLV on PBS TV KLVX.

Filmography

Film

Television

As herself

Other work

References

External links
 Julianne Michelle Official Website
 Julianne Michelle Starpulse filmography  Retrieved 2008-12-29

1987 births
American film actresses
American television actresses
Living people
People from Teaneck, New Jersey
People from the Las Vegas Valley
Actresses from New Jersey
Marymount Manhattan College alumni
Cornell University alumni
20th-century American actresses
21st-century American actresses
American child actresses
Columbia University School of Social Work alumni